Halemba Power Station is a coal-fueled power plant in Halemba district of Ruda Śląska, Silesian Voivodeship, Poland.

The construction of the plant begun in 1943, organized by Nazi German administration of occupied Poland, and using forced labor from Auschwitz Concentration Camp. After the war the plant was finished by the authorities in the People's Republic of Poland, and started operation in 1962. Since 2006 it has reduced operation, and was decommissioned on 1 April 2012.

See also

Halemba Coal Mine
List of power stations in Poland

References

External links
 Official homepage

Energy infrastructure completed in 1962
Coal-fired power stations in Poland
Buildings and structures in Ruda Śląska